Zina is a 1985 award-winning film directed by Ken McMullen. It tells a story of a twentieth century Antigone, Zinaida Volkova (Domiziana Giordano), daughter of Leon Trotsky. In 1930s Berlin, Zina is being treated by the Adlerian psychotherapist Professor Arthur Kronfeld (Ian McKellen). During this psychoanalysis, which includes some hypnosis, she recalls incidents both from her own life and that of her father, as a leader of the  Russian Revolution, as the holder of state power and later in exile. Against the background of the progressive deterioration of the situation in Europe, threatened by the rise of fascism and the spectre of the Second World War, Zina's identification with Antigone becomes more and more credible. What were her hallucinations begin to take objective form on the streets. The dynamics of Greek tragedy, always waiting in the wings, step forward to take control.  Zina has won awards.

Cast
 Domiziana Giordano as Zina Bronstein
 Ian McKellen as Professor Kronfeld
 Philip Madoc as Trotsky
 Rom Anderson as Maria
 Micha Bergese as Molanov
 Dominique Pinon as Pierre
 Gabrielle Dellal as Stenographer
 William Hootkins as Walter Adams
 Leonie Mellinger as German Stenographer
 Paul Geoffrey as Lyova
Tusse Silberg as Jeanne
Maureen O'Brien as Natalya	
 George Yiasoumi as André Breton
George Levantis as Kharalambus
Leonie Mellinger as German Stenographer
Jeffrey Teare as Stalin's Agent in Art Gallery	
Eleanor Greet as Stalin's Agent in Art Gallery

Notes

External links
 
 
 Words by Ian McKellen
 Genealogy of Trotsky's Family at TrotskyanaNet, and here esp. Note 7
 yahoo movies, Trailer of the Movie on YouTube and a scene of that film Trotsky dictating

1985 drama films
1985 films
British independent films
1986 films
1980s English-language films
Films directed by Ken McMullen
British drama films
1985 independent films
1986 drama films
1980s British films